Jimmy Stevens may refer to:

 Jimmy Stevens (politician) (died 1994), Ni-Vanuatu nationalist and politician
 Jimmy Stevens (musician) (born 1942), English singer-songwriter and musician
 Jimmy Stevens (rugby union) (born 1991), English rugby union player

See also 
 James Stevens (disambiguation)